Skeletal Lamping is the ninth studio album by Athens, Georgia-based band of Montreal.

Kevin Barnes said about the title: "This record is my attempt to bring all of my puzzling, contradicting, disturbing, humorous... fantasies, ruminations and observations to the surface, so that I can better dissect and understand their reason for being in my head. Hence the title, Skeletal Lamping."
Lamping is the name of a hunting technique of using a powerful beam to dazzle animals to the extent that they can be approached closely and collected, inspected or shot.

Style
As with most of Montreal albums, Kevin Barnes performed almost all the instrumental and vocal tracks himself.

In an interview with Wireless Bollinger in 2007, Barnes described his concept for the follow-up to Hissing Fauna, Are You the Destroyer? as an album composed of hundreds of consecutive short segments ranging from thirty to fifty seconds in length, with the intention that it "feel like one long piece with hundreds of movements."

In an interview with Pitchfork Media, Barnes stated that of Montreal would continue to evolve with Skeletal Lamping:

"Musically, it is sort of all over the place, too. There really isn't necessarily a sense of continuity there. It's definitely funkier. It's maybe developing off of things like "Faberge Falls for Shuggie" and "Labyrinthian Pomp" from Hissing Fauna. It's kind of moving things in those directions. It's something that I find exciting, as it's not something that I've really worked with a lot in the past. It still holds some mystery for me. I really feel there is something I can use in that genre. It's fun for me too because it kind of [...] goes against the kind and gentle side of indie rock. Funk music is not like that at all."

Distribution
Skeletal Lamping was released on October 21, 2008. The album was released in different formats, including conventional CD and vinyl, as well as T-shirts, a button set, wall decals, and a paper lantern, the latter formats included a digital download code for the album itself.

All items for the collection were designed by The Bee With Wheels (David Barnes) and Gemini Tactics (Nina Barnes), a coalition termed the 'Apollinaire Rave Collective'. In an essay addressing the concept behind the album's release, Kevin Barnes stated "We feel that there’s no reason to produce another object that just sits on a shelf. We only want to produce objects that have a function and that can be treasured for their singularness."

The concept was explained directly on the album's packaging,
"The goal of the Skeletal Lamping Collection is to expand the perception of music packaging beyond traditional flat, square artwork. The album exists in seven different packaging formats: CD, LP, T-shirt, tote bag, button set, paper lantern, and wall decals. Each Item in the Skeletal Lamping Collection includes both the digital album and its unique packaging of the album art.

Ideally, every object you bring into your home should feel exceptional to you, otherwise, it just adds to the clutter and chaos of your life. We feel, there's no reason to produce another object that just sits on a shelf. We only want to produce objects that have functionality and can be treasured for their singularity. Objects that can transform a room, bend the mind and inform your dreams."

Georgie Fruit
Georgie Fruit is the name of Kevin Barnes' African-American cross-dressing stage persona, similar in many ways to David Bowie's alter ego Ziggy Stardust.  Georgie Fruit was first mentioned on Montreal's 2007 album Hissing Fauna, Are You the Destroyer? during the song "Labyrinthian Pomp".

In several interviews, Barnes has described the role of Georgie Fruit on Hissing Fauna, Are You the Destroyer?:
"Barnes himself has described the album as a concept album, 'detailing his transformation from Kevin Barnes into Georgie Fruit.'
...
'The transformation takes place during "The Past Is a Grotesque Animal,' the 12-minute-long 'turning point' of the album."

Georgie Fruit plays a prominent role on Skeletal Lamping.  In the same interview with Pitchfork Media, Barnes elaborated on the Georgie Fruit's background and character:
"The character's name is Georgie Fruit, and he's in his late forties, a black man who has been through multiple sex changes. He's been a man and a woman, and then back to a man. He's been to prison a couple of times. In the 1970s he was in a band called "Arousal", a funk rock band sort of like the Ohio Players. Then he went through a few different phases."

On September 24, 2020, in a post titled "Georgie Fruit Revisited," Kevin Barnes revealed the motive behind the creation of Georgie Fruit, saying "More than a decade ago I created a songwriting persona named Georgie Fruit to help me escape from my chemical depression and neurosis. I wanted to become something glamorous and playful because I was suicidal and miserable. I wanted this character to be as far removed from my real life as possible. So many of my heroes are Black musicians and artists, so I made my writing persona Black. This writing persona was also Trans. Inhabiting this Trans persona actually helped me discover that -even before I knew the term for it- I have always identified as Non Binary."

They went on to apologize, writing "It’s important to me that people understand that I'm cognizant of what is problematic about Georgie Fruit. I apologize to anyone who was hurt or misrepresented by Georgie. It definitely wasn’t my intention to create more pain in the world, especially for our most vulnerable friends."

Music and lyrics in “Wicked Wisdom”, the second track on Skeletal Lamping, have been overdubbed and changed from “I’m just a black she-male”  to “I’m just a powdered belle”  to more accurately reflect Barnes’ statement on Georgie Fruit.

Track listing
All songs written by Kevin Barnes.
 "Nonpareil of Favor" – 5:48
 "Wicked Wisdom" – 5:00
 "For Our Elegant Caste" – 2:35
 "Touched Something's Hollow" – 1:26
 "An Eluardian Instance" – 4:35
 "Gallery Piece" – 3:48
 "Women's Studies Victims" – 2:59
 "St. Exquisite's Confessions" – 4:35
 "Triphallus, to Punctuate!" – 3:23
 "And I've Seen a Bloody Shadow" – 2:23
 "Plastis Wafer" – 7:11
 "Death Isn't a Parallel Move" – 3:01
 "Beware Our Nubile Miscreants" – 4:52
 "Mingusings" – 3:01
 "Id Engager" – 3:24

Polyvinyl digital bonus EP
 Jimmy (M.I.A. cover) - 3:46
 Feminine Effects - 2:56
 Little Rock - 0:58

References

External links
 Live of Montreal performance featuring unreleased tracks
 of Montreal's official website
 Kevin Barnes' announcement of the album being completed.
 URB Magazine album review
 Kevin Barnes talks about Skeletal Lamping with Robin Hilton of NPR
 Billboard review of Skeletal Lamping 
 Apollinaire Rave Collective store on Polyvinyl

2008 albums
Of Montreal albums
Polyvinyl Record Co. albums